Sir Richard Henry Friend  (born 18 January 1953) is a British physicist who was the Cavendish Professor of Physics at the University of Cambridge from 1995 until 2020 and is Tan Chin Tuan Centennial Professor at the National University of Singapore. Friend's research concerns the physics and engineering of carbon-based semiconductors. He also serves as Chairman of the Scientific Advisory Board of the National Research Foundation (NRF) of Singapore.

Education
Friend was educated at Rugby School and Trinity College, Cambridge, gaining a PhD in 1979 under the supervision of Abe Yoffe.

Research
Friend's research has been applied to development of polymer field effect transistors, light-emitting diodes, photovoltaic diodes, optically pumped lasing and directly printed polymer transistors. He pioneered the study of organic polymers and the electronic properties of molecular semiconductors. He is one of the principal investigators in the new Cambridge-based Interdisciplinary Research Collaboration (IRC) on nanotechnology and co-founder of Cambridge Display Technology (CDT) and Plastic Logic. Friend has co-authored over 1,000 publications.

Awards and honours 
In March 2003 Friend won the IEE's Faraday Medal. He was knighted for "services to physics" in the 2003 Birthday Honours.

Friend received an Honorary Doctorate from Heriot-Watt University in 2006

In 2009, Friend was awarded the Institute of Physics Katharine Burr Blodgett Medal and Prize with Dr David Ffye.

In 2010, Friend was elected as one of the three laureates of Millennium Technology Prize for the development of plastic electronics.

In 2011 he was awarded the Harvey Prize of the Technion in Israel. He is a fellow of St John's College, Cambridge. He was elected a Fellow of the Royal Academy of Engineering (FREng) in 2002.

In 2013, Friend was elected a member of the National Academy of Engineering for contributions to science, engineering, and commercialization of organic polymer semiconductor devices.

His nomination for the Royal Society reads:

Personal life
Friend lives in Cambridge with his wife, Carol Anne Maxwell (née Beales) with whom he has two daughters. 

His brother, Peter, is a professor of transplantation and director of the Oxford Transplant Centre.

References

External links
 

British physicists
Fellows of St John's College, Cambridge
People educated at Rugby School
Alumni of Trinity College, Cambridge
Fellows of the Royal Society
Fellows of the Royal Academy of Engineering
Academic staff of the National University of Singapore
Knights Bachelor
Polymer scientists and engineers
Living people
1953 births
Cavendish Professors of Physics